Puerto Rico Highway 866 (PR-866) is a main highway in the city of Toa Baja, Puerto Rico. It begins at its intersection with PR-2 in Candelaria and ends at PR-167 in Levittown.

Major intersections

See also

 List of highways numbered 866

References

External links
 

866
Toa Baja, Puerto Rico